Phytophthora syringae is an oomycete plant pathogen known to infect nursery plants, particularly apple and pear trees. It infects plants through wounded areas and is most pathogenic during cold, wet weather.

References

External links
 Index Fungorum
 USDA ARS Fungal Database

syringae
Water mould plant pathogens and diseases
Apple tree diseases
Pear tree diseases